St. Mary Parish is a parish located in the U.S. state of Louisiana. As of the 2020 census, the population was 49,406. The parish seat is Franklin. The parish was created in 1811.

St. Mary Parish comprises the Morgan City, LA Micropolitan Statistical Area, which is also included in the Lafayette-Opelousas-Morgan City, LA Combined Statistical Area.

Geography
Cypremort Point State Park is located in the parish on Vermilion Bay.

Major highways
  Future Interstate 49
  U.S. Highway 90
  Louisiana Highway 83
  Louisiana Highway 87
  Louisiana Highway 182
  Louisiana Highway 317
  Louisiana Highway 318

Adjacent parishes
 Iberia Parish  (north)
 St. Martin Parish  (east)
 Assumption Parish  (southeast)
 Terrebonne Parish  (south)

Protected areas
The parish has both national and state protected areas within its borders.

National protected area
 Bayou Teche National Wildlife Refuge

State protected areas
Part of the Attakapas Wildlife Management Area is located within St. Mary Parish as well as in St. Martin and Iberia Parishes.

Communities

Cities
 Franklin (parish seat)
 Morgan City
 Patterson

Towns
 Baldwin
 Berwick

Census-designated places
 Amelia
 Bayou Vista
 Charenton
 Glencoe
 Siracusaville
 Sorrel

Other unincorporated areas
 Centerville
 Florence
 Garden City

Demographics

As of the 2020 United States census, there were 49,406 people, 19,856 households, and 11,354 families residing in the parish. As of the census of 2000, there were 53,500 people, 19,317 households, and 14,082 families residing in the parish.  The population density was 87 people per square mile (34/km2).  There were 21,650 housing units at an average density of 35 per square mile (14/km2).  The racial makeup of the parish was 62.79% White, 31.79% Black or African American, 1.39% Native American, 1.64% Asian, 0.02% Pacific Islander, 0.88% from other races, and 1.50% from two or more races.  2.15% of the population were Hispanic or Latino of any race. 5.43% reported speaking French or Cajun French at home, while 2.45% speak Spanish and 1.59% Vietnamese.

There were 19,317 households, out of which 36.70% had children under the age of 18 living with them, 51.00% were married couples living together, 16.50% had a female householder with no husband present, and 27.10% were non-families. 23.20% of all households were made up of individuals, and 8.70% had someone living alone who was 65 years of age or older.  The average household size was 2.74 and the average family size was 3.23.

In the parish the population was spread out, with 29.70% under the age of 18, 8.70% from 18 to 24, 28.70% from 25 to 44, 21.90% from 45 to 64, and 11.00% who were 65 years of age or older.  The median age was 34 years. For every 100 females there were 95.00 males.  For every 100 females age 18 and over, there were 92.20 males.

The median income for a household in the parish was $28,072, and the median income for a family was $33,064. Males had a median income of $31,570 versus $18,341 for females. The per capita income for the parish was $13,399.  About 20.60% of families and 23.60% of the population were below the poverty line, including 31.30% of those under age 18 and 19.00% of those age 65 or over.

Education
St. Mary Parish School Board operates local public schools.

The Chitimacha Day School, affiliated with the Bureau of Indian Education (BIE), is in the Charenton community of unincorporated St. Mary Parish.

It is in the service area of Fletcher Technical Community College.

Media
St. Mary Parish has two daily newspapers, the Morgan City Daily Review (circulation under 6,000) and the Franklin Banner-Tribune in Franklin (circulation 3,350).

National Guard
B Company 2-156TH Infantry Battalion of the 256TH IBCT resides in Franklin, Louisiana.  This unit has deployed to Iraq twice, 2004-5 and 2010.

Politics

Notable people
 Bret Allain (born c. 1958), sugar cane farmer and the current District 21 state senator from St. Mary Parish
 Clarence C. "Taddy" Aycock (1915–1987), state House Speaker from 1952 to 1956 and lieutenant governor from 1960 to 1972
 Carl W. Bauer (1933-2013), attorney-lobbyist; former member of both houses of the Louisiana State Legislature
 Ralph Norman Bauer (1899-1963), attorney; former Speaker of the Louisiana House; a leader of the impeachment forces against Governor Huey P. Long, Jr., in 1929
 V.J. Bella (born 1927), former state representative (1972–1990) and state fire marshal (1990–1992; 1996–2004)
 Elizabeth Bisland (1861–1929), noted journalist and author
 Sally Clausen, former president of Southeastern Louisiana University in Hammoned and Louisiana commissioner of higher education; reared in St. Mary Parish
 Thomas G. Clausen, Louisiana education superintendent from 1984 to 1988; reared in St. Mary Parish
 Murphy James "Mike" Foster, Jr. (1930-2020), governor of Louisiana from 1996 to 2004
 Sam S. Jones, state representative for St. Mary Parish since 2008
 Geronimo Pratt, Vietnam War veteran who served twenty-seven years in prison wrongfully accused of murder
 William Joseph Seymour (born 1870), considered to be the most influential African American minister of the twentieth century and pastor of the famous Azusa Street Revival
 Lester Vetter, reared in St. Mary Parish; mayor of Coushatta prior to 1952 and state representative for Red River Parish from 1952 until his death in office in 1960
 Warren Wells, Pro football player for the Detroit Lions and Oakland Raiders
 Dale Hawkins, (born 1936, died 2010) pioneer of swamp rock boogie

See also

 National Register of Historic Places listings in St. Mary Parish, Louisiana

References

External links
 St. Mary Parish Sheriff's Office

 
Parishes in Acadiana
Saint Mary Parish, Louisiana
Saint Mary Parish, Louisiana
1811 establishments in the Territory of Orleans
Populated places established in 1811